New Trombone is the debut album by trombonist Curtis Fuller recorded in 1957 and originally released on Prestige Records.

Reception

In his review for AllMusic, Scott Yanow wrote, "Trombonist Curtis Fuller's debut as a leader was a strong start to the 22-year-old's career... all of the musicians fare quite well".

Track listing
All compositions by Curtis Fuller except as indicated
 "Vonce #5" – 7:40
 "Transportation Blues" – 8:18
 "Blue Lawson" - 6:51
 "Namely You" (Gene de Paul, Johnny Mercer) – 9:25
 "What Is This Thing Called Love?" (Cole Porter) – 6:30
 "Alicia" (bonus track on CD)

Personnel
Curtis Fuller – trombone
Sonny Red – alto saxophone
Hank Jones – piano
Doug Watkins – bass
Louis Hayes – drums

References

Prestige Records albums
Curtis Fuller albums
1957 debut albums
Albums recorded at Van Gelder Studio
Albums produced by Bob Weinstock